Kuusamojärvi is a lake in Finland. It is situated in the town of Kuusamo in the Northern Ostrobothnia region in northern Finland.

The lake is a part of the Kem River basin that drains into the White Sea in the Republic of Karelia, Russia.

See also
List of lakes in Finland

References
 Finnish Environment Institute: Lakes in Finland

LKuusamojarvi
Landforms of North Ostrobothnia
Lakes of Kuusamo